Grace Norman (born March 9, 1998) is an American Parathlete. She was the 2016 Paralympics gold medalist in the Women's individual PT4 Paratriathlon. She also won the silver medal in the women's PTS5 event at the 2020 Summer Paralympics held in Tokyo, Japan.
She attended and raced for Cedarville University from 2016 to 2020.

References

External links 
 
 

1998 births
Living people
American female triathletes
Paratriathletes of the United States
Paralympic medalists in paratriathlon
Paralympic gold medalists for the United States
Paralympic silver medalists for the United States
Paratriathletes at the 2016 Summer Paralympics
Paratriathletes at the 2020 Summer Paralympics
Medalists at the 2016 Summer Paralympics
Medalists at the 2020 Summer Paralympics
People from Jamestown, Ohio
Cedarville Yellow Jackets
College women's track and field athletes in the United States
Cedarville University alumni